The 1976–77 NCAA Division I men's basketball rankings was made up of two human polls, the AP Poll and the Coaches Poll, in addition to various other preseason polls.

Legend

AP Poll

UPI Poll

References 

1976–77 NCAA Division I men's basketball season
College men's basketball rankings in the United States